Pisces is a jazz album by Art Blakey & the Jazz Messengers. It was recorded between 1961 and 1964, but not issued on Blue Note Records until 1979. More a compilation than an album, all the tracks, except for "It's A Long Way Down", may be found on the Mosaic compilation The Complete Blue Note Recordings of Art Blakey's 1960 Jazz Messengers. Moreover, "Uptight", and "Pisces" are included on the CD reissue of The Freedom Rider, whilst "It's a Long Way Down" is featured on the CD reissue of Indestructible. Ultimately, "United" and "Ping Pong" may be found on Roots & Herbs.

Track listing

Original LP
 "United" (Shorter) - 6:49
 "Ping Pong" (Shorter) - 5:59
 "Pisces" (Morgan) - 6:54
 "Blue Ching" (Dorham) - 6:47
 "Uptight" (Morgan) - 6:16
 "It's a Long Way Down" (Shorter) - 5:26

2013 CD reissue (4569943)
The Solar Records (EU) reissue also features some tracks from the same sessions, already available on The Freedom Rider and Roots & Herbs.

 "United" (Shorter) - 6:49
 "Ping Pong" (Shorter) - 5:59
 "Pisces" (Morgan) - 6:54
 "Uptight" (Morgan) - 6:16
 "Blue Ching" (Dorham) - 6:47
 "It's a Long Way Down" (Shorter) - 5:26
 "Ping Pong" [Alternate Take] - 7:10
 "United" [Alternate Take] - 7:25
 "Roots and Herbs" 6:06
 "Look at the Birdie" - 6:43
 "Master Mind" - 6:53
 "Petty Larceny" - 6:15

Personnel
Art Blakey - drums, leader
Lee Morgan - trumpet
Wayne Shorter - tenor saxophone
Bobby Timmons (#1-5), Cedar Walton (#6) - piano
Jymie Merritt (#1-5), Reggie Workman (#6) - bass
Curtis Fuller - trombone (#6)

References

Art Blakey albums
The Jazz Messengers albums
Blue Note Records albums
Albums produced by Alfred Lion
1979 albums